A spark chamber is a particle detector: a device used in particle physics for detecting electrically charged particles. They were most widely used as research tools from the 1930s to the 1960s and have since been superseded by other technologies such as drift chambers and silicon detectors. Today, working spark chambers are mostly found in science museums and educational organisations, where they are used to demonstrate aspects of particle physics and astrophysics.

Spark chambers consist of a stack of metal plates placed in a sealed box filled with a gas such as helium, neon or a mixture of the two. When a charged particle from a cosmic ray travels through the box, it ionises the gas between the plates. Ordinarily this ionisation would remain invisible. However, if a high enough voltage can be applied between each adjacent pair of plates before that ionisation disappears, then sparks can be made to form along the trajectory taken by the ray, and the cosmic ray in effect becomes visible as a line of sparks. In order to control when this voltage is applied, a separate detector (often containing a pair of scintillators placed above and below the box) is needed. When this trigger senses that a cosmic ray has just passed, it fires a fast switch to connect the high voltage to the plates. The high voltage cannot be connected to the plates permanently, as this would lead to arc formation and continuous discharging.

As research devices, spark chamber detectors have lower resolution than bubble chamber detectors. However they can be made highly selective with the help of auxiliary detectors, making them useful in searching for very rare events.

Related devices

A streamer chamber is a type of detector closely related to the spark chamber.  In a spark chamber one looks at a stack of parallel plates edge-on.  For this reason, best viewing is afforded when the particle comes in perpendicularly to the plates. A streamer chamber, in contrast, typically has only two plates, at least one of which is transparent (e.g. wire mesh or a conductive glass). Particles come in roughly parallel to the plane of these plates. A much shorter high-voltage pulse is used than with a spark chamber, so there is insufficient time for sparks to form. Instead very dim streamers of ionised gas are formed. These can be seen when image enhancement is applied.

See also
 Electric spark
 Cloud chamber
 Bubble chamber

External links
 University of Cambridge Spark Chambers
 Spark Chamber Project - McGill University
 "How does a spark chamber work?" - From an exhibitor at the 2011 Royal Society Summer Science Exhibition.
 "How does a spark chamber work?" - University of Birmingham
 Enhanced image of streamers taken in a steamer chamber

Particle detectors